The history of eugenics is the study of development and advocacy of ideas related to eugenics around the world. Early eugenic ideas were discussed in Ancient Greece and Rome. The height of the modern eugenics movement came in the late 19th and early 20th centuries.

History

The original form of eugenics  was most famously expounded by Plato, who believed human reproduction should be monitored and controlled by the state. However, Plato understood this form of government control would not be readily accepted, and proposed the truth be concealed from the public via a fixed lottery. Mates, in Plato's Republic, would be chosen by a "marriage number" in which the quality of the individual would be quantitatively analyzed, and persons of high numbers would be allowed to procreate with other persons of high numbers. In theory, this would lead to predictable results and the improvement of the human race. However, Plato acknowledged the failure of the "marriage number" since "gold soul" persons could still produce "bronze soul" children. Plato's ideas may have been one of the earliest attempts to mathematically analyze genetic inheritance, which was later improved by the development of Mendelian genetics and the mapping of the human genome.

Other ancient civilizations, such as Rome, Athens and Sparta, practiced infanticide through exposure and execution as a form of phenotypic selection. In Sparta, newborns were inspected by the city's elders, who decided the fate of the infant. If the child was deemed incapable of living, it was usually exposed in the Apothetae near the Taygetus mountain. As of 2007, the dumping of infants near Mount Taygete has been called into question due to a lack of physical evidence.  Anthropologist Theodoros Pitsios' research has found only bodies of adolescents up to the age of approximately 35.       

Trials for babies included bathing them in wine and exposing them to the elements. To Sparta, this would ensure only the strongest survived and procreated. Adolf Hitler considered Sparta to be the first "Völkisch State", and much like Ernst Haeckel before him, praised Sparta for its selective infanticide policy.

The Twelve Tables of Roman Law, established early in the formation of the Roman Republic, stated in the fourth table that deformed children must be put to death. In addition, patriarchs in Roman society were given the right to "discard" infants at their discretion. This was often done by drowning undesired newborns in the Tiber River. Commenting on the Roman practice of eugenics, the philosopher Seneca wrote that: "We put down mad dogs; we kill the wild, untamed ox; we use the knife on sick sheep to stop their infecting the flock; we destroy abnormal offspring at birth; children, too, if they are born weak or deformed, we drown. Yet this is not the work of anger, but of reason – to separate the sound from the worthless". The practice of open infanticide in the Roman Empire did not subside until its Christianization, which however also mandated negative eugenics, e.g. by the council of Adge in 506, which forbade marriage between cousins.

Galton's theory

Sir Francis Galton (1822–1911) systematized these ideas and practices according to new knowledge about the evolution of man and animals provided by the theory of his half-cousin Charles Darwin during the 1860s and 1870s. After reading Darwin's Origin of Species, Galton built upon Darwin's ideas whereby the mechanisms of natural selection were potentially thwarted by human civilization. He reasoned that, since many human societies sought to protect the underprivileged and weak, those societies were at odds with the natural selection responsible for extinction of the weakest; and only by changing these social policies could society be saved from a "reversion towards mediocrity", a phrase he first coined in statistics and which later changed to the now-common "regression towards the mean".

Galton first sketched out his theory in the 1865 article "Hereditary Talent and Character", then elaborated further in his 1869 book Hereditary Genius. He began by studying the way in which human intellectual, moral, and personality traits tended to run in families. Galton's basic argument was "genius" and "talent" were hereditary traits in humans (although neither he nor Darwin yet had a working model of this type of heredity). He concluded since one could use artificial selection to exaggerate traits in other animals, one could expect similar results when applying such models to humans. As he wrote in the introduction to Hereditary Genius:

I propose to show in this book that a man's natural abilities are derived by inheritance, under exactly the same limitations as are the form and physical features of the whole organic world. Consequently, as it is easy, notwithstanding those limitations, to obtain by careful selection a permanent breed of dogs or horses gifted with peculiar powers of running, or of doing anything else, so it would be quite practicable to produce a highly gifted race of men by judicious marriages during several consecutive generations.

Galton claimed that the less intelligent were more fertile than the more intelligent of his time. Galton did not propose any selection methods; rather, he hoped a solution would be found if social mores changed in a way that encouraged people to see the importance of breeding. He first used the word eugenic in his 1883 Inquiries into Human Faculty and Its Development, a book in which he meant "to touch on various topics more or less connected with that of the cultivation of race, or, as we might call it, with 'eugenic' questions". He included a footnote to the word "eugenic" which read:

That is, with questions bearing on what is termed in Greek, eugenes namely, good in stock, hereditary endowed with noble qualities. This, and the allied words, eugeneia, etc., are equally applicable to men, brutes, and plants. We greatly want a brief word to express the science of improving stock, which is by no means confined to questions of judicious mating, but which, especially in the case of man, takes cognizance of all influences that tend in however remote a degree to give to the more suitable races or strains of blood a better chance of prevailing speedily over the less suitable than they otherwise would have had. The word eugenics would sufficiently express the idea; it is at least a neater word and a more generalized one than viriculture which I once ventured to use.

In 1908, in Memories of my Life, Galton stated the official definition of eugenics: "the study of agencies under social control that may improve or impair the racial qualities of future generations, either physically or mentally". This had been agreed in consultation with a committee that included the biometrician Karl Pearson. It was slightly at odds with Galton's preferred definition, given in a lecture to the newly formed Sociological Society at the London School of Economics in 1904: "the science which deals with all influences that improve the inborn qualities of a race; also with those that develop them to the utmost advantage". The latter definition, which encompassed nurture and environment as well as heredity, was favoured by broadly left wing, liberal elements of the ensuing ideological divide.

Galton's formulation of eugenics was based on a strong statistical approach, influenced heavily by Adolphe Quetelet's "social physics". Unlike Quetelet, however, Galton did not exalt the "average man" but decried him as mediocre. Galton and his statistical heir Karl Pearson developed what was called the biometrical approach to eugenics, which developed new and complex statistical models (later exported to wholly different fields) to describe the heredity of traits. However, with the rediscovery of Gregor Mendel's hereditary laws, two separate camps of eugenics advocates emerged. One was made up of statisticians, the other of biologists. Statisticians thought the biologists had exceptionally crude mathematical models, while biologists thought the statisticians knew little about biology.

Eugenics eventually referred to human selective reproduction with an intent to create children with desirable traits, generally through the approach of influencing differential birth rates. These policies were mostly divided into two categories: positive eugenics, the increased reproduction of those seen to have advantageous hereditary traits; and negative eugenics, the discouragement of reproduction by those with hereditary traits perceived as poor. Negative eugenic policies in the past have ranged from paying those deemed to have bad genes to voluntarily undergo sterilization, to attempts at segregation to compulsory sterilization and even genocide. Positive eugenic policies have typically taken the form of awards or bonuses for "fit" parents who have another child. Relatively innocuous practices like marriage counseling had early links with eugenic ideology. Eugenics is superficially related to what would later be known as Social Darwinism. While both claimed intelligence was hereditary, eugenics asserted new policies were needed to actively change the status quo towards a more "eugenic" state, while the Social Darwinists argued society itself would naturally "check" the problem of "dysgenics" if no welfare policies were in place (for example, the poor might reproduce more but would have higher mortality rates).

Charles Davenport
Charles Davenport (1866-1944), a scientist from the United States, stands out as one of history's leading eugenicists. He took eugenics from a scientific idea to a worldwide movement implemented in many countries. Davenport obtained funding from the Carnegie Institution, to establish the Station for Experimental Evolution at Cold Spring Harbor in 1904 and the Eugenics Records Office in 1910, which provided the scientific basis for later Eugenic policies such as enforced sterilization.  He became the first President of the International Federation of Eugenics Organizations (IFEO) in 1925, an organization he was instrumental in building. While Davenport was located at Cold Spring Harbor and received money from the Carnegie Institute of Washington, the organization known as the Eugenics Record Office (ERO) started to become an embarrassment after the well-known debates between Davenport and Franz Boas. Instead, Davenport occupied the same office and the same address at Cold Spring Harbor, but his organization now became known as the Cold Spring Harbor Laboratories, which currently retains the archives of the Eugenics Record Office. However, Davenport's racist views were not supported by all geneticists at Cold Spring Harbor, including H. J. Muller, Bentley Glass, and Esther Lederberg.

In 1932, Davenport welcomed Ernst Rüdin, a prominent Swiss eugenicist and race scientist, as his successor in the position of President of the IFEO.  Rüdin, director of the Deutsche Forschungsgemeinschaft (German Research Institute for Psychiatry, located in Munich), a Kaiser Wilhelm Institute, was a co-founder (with his brother-in-law Alfred Ploetz) of the German Society for Racial Hygiene.  Rudin's half-brother Ploetz recommended a "racial hygiene" system in which panels of physicians decided whether to grant individuals citizenship or euthanasia. Other prominent figures in eugenics who were associated with Davenport included Harry Laughlin (United States), Havelock Ellis (United Kingdom), Irving Fischer (United States), Eugen Fischer (Germany), Madison Grant (United States), Lucien Howe (United States), and Margaret Sanger (United States, founder of a New York health clinic that later became Planned Parenthood).  Later Sanger commissioned the first birth control pill.

United Kingdom

In September 1903, an "Inter-departmental Committee on Physical Deterioration" chaired by Almeric W. FitzRoy was appointed by the government "to make a preliminary enquiry into the allegations concerning the deterioration of certain classes of the population as shown by the large percentage of rejections for physical causes of recruits for the Army", and gave its Report to both houses of parliament in the following year. Among its recommendations, originating from professor Daniel John Cunningham, were an anthropometric survey of the British population. The Catholic church was opposed to eugenics, as illustrated in the writings of Father Thomas John Gerrard.

Eugenics was supported by many prominent figures of different political persuasions before World War I (and as positive eugenics after the War), including: Liberal economists William Beveridge and John Maynard Keynes; Fabian socialists such as the Irish author George Bernard Shaw, H. G. Wells, Havelock Ellis, Beatrice Webb and Sidney Webb and other literary figures such as D. H. Lawrence; and Conservatives such as the future Prime Minister Winston Churchill and Arthur Balfour. The influential economist John Maynard Keynes was a prominent supporter of eugenics, serving as Director of the British Eugenics Society, and  writing that eugenics is "the most important, significant and, I would add, genuine branch of sociology which exists".

Francis Galton explained during a lecture in 1901 the groupings which are shown in the opening figure and indicated the proportion of society falling into each group, along with their perceived genetic worth. Galton suggested that negative eugenics (i.e. an attempt to prevent them from bearing offspring) should be applied only to those in the lowest social group (the "Undesirables"), while positive eugenics applied to the higher classes. However, he appreciated the worth of the higher working classes to society and industry.

The 1913 Mental Deficiency Act proposed the mass segregation of the "feeble minded" from the rest of society. Sterilisation programmes were never legalised, although some were carried out in private upon the mentally ill by clinicians who were in favour of a more widespread eugenics plan. The Act, however, enabled the formation of residential schools for the "feeble minded" by social workers such as Mary Dendy.  Indeed, those in support of eugenics shifted their lobbying of Parliament from enforced to voluntary sterilization, in the hope of achieving more legal recognition.  But leave for the Labour Party Member of Parliament Major A. G. Church, to propose a Private Member's Bill in 1931, which would legalise the operation for voluntary sterilization, was rejected by 167 votes to 89. The limited popularity of eugenics in the United Kingdom was reflected by the fact that only two universities established courses in this field (University College London and Liverpool University). The Galton Institute, affiliated to UCL, was headed by Galton's protégé, Karl Pearson.

In 2008, the British Parliament passed a law prohibiting couples from choosing deaf and disabled embryos for implantation.

United States

One of the earliest modern advocates of eugenics (before it was labeled as such) was Alexander Graham Bell. In 1881 Bell investigated the rate of deafness on Martha's Vineyard, Massachusetts. From this he concluded that deafness was hereditary in nature and, through noting that congenitally deaf parents were more likely to produce deaf children, tentatively suggested that couples where both were deaf should not marry, in his lecture Memoir upon the formation of a deaf variety of the human race presented to the National Academy of Sciences on 13 November 1883. However, it was his hobby of livestock breeding which led to his appointment to biologist David Starr Jordan's Committee on Eugenics, under the auspices of the American Breeders' Association (ABA). The committee unequivocally extended the principle to humans.

Another scientist considered the "father of the American eugenics movement" was Charles Benedict Davenport.  In 1904 he secured funding for the Station for Experimental Evolution, later renamed the Carnegie Department of Genetics.  It was also around that time that Davenport became actively involved with the ABA. This led to Davenport's first eugenics text, "The science of human improvement by better breeding", one of the first papers to connect agriculture and human heredity. Davenport later went on to set up a Eugenics Record Office (ERO), collecting hundreds of thousands of medical histories from Americans, which many considered to have a racist and anti-immigration agenda. Davenport and his views were supported at Cold Spring Harbor Laboratory as late as 1963, when his views began to be de-emphasized.

As the science continued in the 20th century, researchers interested in familial mental disorders conducted a number of studies to document the heritability of such illnesses as schizophrenia, bipolar disorder, and depression. Their findings were used by the eugenics movement as proof for its cause. State laws were written in the late 19th and early 20th centuries to prohibit marriage and force sterilization of the mentally ill in order to prevent the "passing on" of mental illness to the next generation. These laws were upheld by the U.S. Supreme Court in 1927 and were not abolished until the mid-20th century.  All in all, 60,000 Americans were sterilized.

Michigan became the first state to introduce a compulsory sterilization bill on May 16, 1897. However, the law did not pass. The proposed law, which called for the mandatory castration of defined types of criminals and "degenerates," fails to pass in the legislature but sets a precedent for similar laws. In 1907 Indiana became the first of more than thirty states to adopt legislation aimed at compulsory sterilization of certain individuals. Although the law was overturned by the Indiana Supreme Court in 1921, the U.S. Supreme Court upheld the constitutionality of a Virginia law allowing for the compulsory sterilization of patients of state mental institutions in 1927.

Beginning with Connecticut in 1896, many states enacted marriage laws with eugenic criteria, prohibiting anyone who was "epileptic, imbecile or feeble-minded" from marrying. In 1898 Charles B. Davenport, a prominent American biologist, began as director of a biological research station based in Cold Spring Harbor where he experimented with evolution in plants and animals. In 1904 Davenport received funds from the Carnegie Institution to found the Station for Experimental Evolution. The Eugenics Record Office (ERO) opened in 1910 while Davenport and Harry H. Laughlin began to promote eugenics.

W. E. B. Du Bois maintained the basic principle of eugenics: that different persons have different inborn characteristics that make them more or less suited for specific kinds of employment, and that by encouraging the most talented members of all races to procreate would better the "stocks" of humanity.

The Immigration Restriction League (founded in 1894) was the first American entity associated officially with eugenics. The League sought to bar what it considered dysgenic members of certain races from entering America and diluting what it saw as the superior American racial stock through procreation. They lobbied for a literacy test for immigrants, based on the belief that literacy rates were low among "inferior races". Literacy test bills were vetoed by President William McKinley in 1897 and by President Woodrow Wilson in 1913 and 1915; eventually, President Wilson's second veto was overruled by Congress in 1917. Membership in the League included: A. Lawrence Lowell, president of Harvard University, William DeWitt Hyde, president of Bowdoin College, James T. Young, director of Wharton School, and David Starr Jordan, president of Stanford University. The League allied themselves with the American Breeder's Association to gain influence and further its goals and in 1909 established a eugenics committee chaired by David Starr Jordan with members Charles Davenport, Alexander Graham Bell, Vernon Kellogg, Luther Burbank, William Earnest Castle, Adolf Meyer, H. J. Webber and Friedrich Woods. The ABA's immigration legislation committee, formed in 1911 and headed by League's founder Prescott F. Hall, formalized the committee's already strong relationship with the Immigration Restriction League.

In years to come, the ERO collected a mass of family pedigrees and concluded that those who were unfit came from economically and socially poor backgrounds. Eugenicists such as Davenport, the psychologist Henry H. Goddard and the conservationist Madison Grant (all well respected in their time) began to lobby for various solutions to the problem of the "unfit". (Davenport favored immigration restriction and sterilization as primary methods; Goddard favored segregation in his The Kallikak Family; Grant favored all of the above and more, even entertaining the idea of extermination.) Though their methodology and research methods are now understood as highly flawed, at the time this was seen as legitimate scientific research. It did, however, have scientific detractors (notably, Thomas Hunt Morgan, one of the few Mendelians to explicitly criticize eugenics), though most of these focused more on what they considered the crude methodology of eugenicists, and the characterization of almost every human characteristic as being hereditary, rather than the idea of eugenics itself.

Some states sterilized "imbeciles" for much of the 20th century. The U.S. Supreme Court ruled in the 1927 Buck v. Bell case that the state of Virginia could sterilize individuals under the Virginia Sterilization Act of 1924. The most significant era of eugenic sterilization was between 1907 and 1963, when over 64,000 individuals were forcibly sterilized under eugenics legislation in the United States. A favorable report on the results of sterilization in California, the state with the most sterilizations by far, was published in book form by the biologist Paul Popenoe and was widely cited by the Nazi government as evidence that wide-reaching sterilization programs were feasible and humane.

Such legislation was passed in the U.S. because of widespread public acceptance of the eugenics movement, spearheaded by efforts of progressive reformers. Over 19 million people attended the Panama-Pacific International Exposition in San Francisco, open for 10 months from February 20 to December 4, 1915. The PPIE was a fair devoted to extolling the virtues of a rapidly progressing nation, featuring new developments in science, agriculture, manufacturing and technology. A subject that received a large amount of time and space was that of the developments concerning health and disease, particularly the areas of tropical medicine and race betterment (tropical medicine being the combined study of bacteriology, parasitology and entomology while racial betterment being the promotion of eugenic studies). Having these areas so closely intertwined, it seemed that they were both categorized in the main theme of the fair, the advancement of civilization. Thus in the public eye, the seemingly contradictory areas of study were both represented under progressive banners of improvement and were made to seem like plausible courses of action to better American society.

The state of California was at the vanguard of the American eugenics movement, performing about 20,000 sterilizations or one-third of the 60,000 nationwide from 1909 up until the 1960s. By 1910, there was a large and dynamic network of scientists, reformers and professionals engaged in national eugenics projects and actively promoting eugenic legislation. The American Breeder's Association was the first eugenic body in the U.S., established in 1906 under the direction of biologist Charles B. Davenport. The ABA was formed specifically to "investigate and report on heredity in the human race, and emphasize the value of superior blood and the menace to society of inferior blood". Membership included Alexander Graham Bell, Stanford president David Starr Jordan and Luther Burbank.

When Nazi administrators went on trial for war crimes in Nuremberg after World War II, they attempted to justify the mass sterilizations (over 450,000 in less than a decade) by citing the United States as their inspiration. The Nazis had claimed American eugenicists inspired and supported Hitler's racial purification laws, and failed to understand the connection between those policies and the eventual genocide of the Holocaust.

The idea of "genius" and "talent" is also considered by William Graham Sumner, a founder of the American Sociological Society (now called the American Sociological Association). He maintained that if the government did not meddle with the social policy of laissez-faire, a class of genius would rise to the top of the system of social stratification, followed by a class of talent. Most of the rest of society would fit into the class of mediocrity. Those who were considered to be defective (mentally delayed, handicapped, etc.) had a negative effect on social progress by draining off necessary resources. They should be left on their own to sink or swim. But those in the class of delinquent (criminals, deviants, etc.) should be eliminated from society ("Folkways", 1907).

However, methods of eugenics were applied to reformulate more restrictive definitions of white racial purity in existing state laws banning interracial marriage: the so-called anti-miscegenation laws. The most famous example of the influence of eugenics and its emphasis on strict racial segregation on such "anti-miscegenation" legislation was Virginia's Racial Integrity Act of 1924. The U.S. Supreme Court overturned this law in 1967 in Loving v. Virginia, and declared anti-miscegenation laws unconstitutional.

With the passage of the Immigration Act of 1924, eugenicists for the first time played an important role in the Congressional debate as expert advisers on the threat of "inferior stock" from eastern and southern Europe.  While eugenicists did support the act, they were also backed by many labor unions. The new act, inspired by the eugenic belief in the racial superiority of "old stock" white Americans as members of the "Nordic race" (a form of white supremacy), strengthened the position of existing laws prohibiting race-mixing. Eugenic considerations also lay behind the adoption of incest laws in much of the U.S. and were used to justify many anti-miscegenation laws.

Stephen Jay Gould asserted that restrictions on immigration passed in the United States during the 1920s (and overhauled in 1965 with the Immigration and Nationality Act) were motivated by the goals of eugenics. During the early 20th century, the United States and Canada began to receive far higher numbers of Southern and Eastern European immigrants. It has been argued that this stirred both Canada and the United States into passing laws creating a hierarchy of nationalities, rating them from the most desirable Anglo-Saxon and Nordic peoples to the Chinese and Japanese immigrants, who were almost completely banned from entering the country. Others, however, argued that Congress gave virtually no consideration to these factors, and claim the restrictions were motivated primarily by a desire to maintain the country's cultural integrity against the heavy influx of foreigners.

In the US, eugenic supporters included Theodore Roosevelt, Research was funded by distinguished philanthropies and carried out at prestigious universities. It was taught in college and high school classrooms. Margaret Sanger founded Planned Parenthood of America to urge the legalization of contraception for poor, immigrant women. In its time eugenics was touted by some as scientific and progressive, the natural application of knowledge about breeding to the arena of human life. Before the realization of death camps in World War II, the idea that eugenics would lead to genocide was not taken seriously by the average American.

Australia

The policy of removing mixed-race Aboriginal children from their parents emerged from an opinion based on Eugenics theory in late 19th and early 20th century Australia that the 'full-blood' tribal Aborigine would be unable to sustain itself, and was doomed to inevitable extinction, as at the time huge numbers of aborigines were in fact dying out, from diseases caught from European settlers. An ideology at the time held that mankind could be divided into a civilizational hierarchy. This notion supposed that Northern Europeans were superior in civilization and that Aborigines were inferior. According to this view, the increasing numbers of mixed-descent children in Australia, labeled as "half-castes" (or alternatively "crossbreeds", "quadroons", and "octoroons") should develop within their respective communities, white or aboriginal, according to their dominant parentage.

In the first half of the 20th century, this led to policies and legislation that resulted in the removal of children from their tribe.
The stated aim was to culturally assimilate mixed-descent people into contemporary Australian society. In all states and territories legislation was passed in the early years of the 20th century which gave Aboriginal protectors guardianship rights over Aborigines up to the age of sixteen or twenty-one. Policemen or other agents of the state (such as Aboriginal Protection Officers), were given the power to locate and transfer babies and children of mixed descent from their communities into institutions. In these Australian states and territories, half-caste institutions (both government or missionary) were established in the early decades of the 20th century for the reception of these separated children. The 2002 movie Rabbit-Proof Fence portrays a true story about this system and the harrowing consequences of attempting to overcome it.

In 1922, A.O. Neville was appointed the second Western Australia State Chief Protector of Aborigines. During the next quarter-century, he presided over the now notorious 'Assimilation' policy of removing mixed-race Aboriginal children from their parents.

Neville believed that biological absorption was the key to 'uplifting the Native race'. Speaking before the Moseley Royal Commission, which investigated the administration of Aboriginals in 1934, he defended the policies of forced settlement, removing children from parents, surveillance, discipline and punishment, arguing that "they have to be protected against themselves whether they like it or not. They cannot remain as they are. The sore spot requires the application of the surgeon's knife for the good of the patient, and probably against the patient's will". In his twilight years, Neville continued to actively promote his policy. Towards the end of his career, Neville published Australia's Coloured Minority, a text outlining his plan for the biological absorption of aboriginal people into white Australia.

Brazil

The idea of  Social Darwinism was widespread among Brazil's leading scientists, educators, social thinkers, as well as many elected officials, in the late 1800s and early 1900s. This led to the "Politica de Branqueamento" (Whitening Policies) set in practice in Brazil in the early part of the 20th century. This series of laws intended to enlarge the numbers of the white race in Brazil through miscegenation with European immigrants.

The first official organized movement of eugenics in South America was a Eugenics Conference in April 1917, which was followed in January 1918 by the founding of the São Paulo Society of Eugenics. This society worked with health agencies and psychiatric offices to promote their ideas. The year 1931 saw the foundation of the "Comitê Central de Eugenismo" (Central Committee on Eugenics) presided by Renato Kehl. Among its suggestions were an end to the immigration of non-whites to Brazil, and the spread of policies against miscegenation.

The ideas of the Central Committee on Eugenics clashed with the Whitening Policies of the beginning of the 20th century. While the Whitening Policies advocated miscegenation in order to reduce the numbers of pure Africans in Brazil in favor of mulattos, who were expected to then produce white off-spring – a policy very similar to the "uplifting the Native race" in Australia – the Central Committee on Eugenics advocated no miscegenation at all and separation between the whites and non-whites in Brazil. When it became obvious that the future of Brazil was in industrialization (just as it was for other countries around the world), Brazil had to face whether they had a working force capable of being absorbed by an industrial society. 

A new ideology was needed to counter such racialist claims. This ideology, known as Lusotropicalism, was associated with Gilberto Freyre, and became popular throughout the Portuguese Empire: specifically, Brazil and Angola. Lusotropicalism claimed that its large population of mixed-race people made Brazil the most capable country in tropical climates to carry out a program of industrialization. Its mixed-race population had the cultural and intellectual capabilities provided by the white race, which could not work in tropical climates, combined with the physical ability to work in tropical climates, provided by the African black race. This excluded the fact that white prisoners, working under penal servitude in Puerto Rico, seemed quite capable of working in a tropical environment.

Rockefeller Foundation in Brazil

In the first decades of the twentieth century, the work of the Rockefeller Foundation was decisive for the implementation of public health initiatives in Brazil, especially in the so-called public health movement. At that time, Brazilian eugenics was the same as public health, as expressed in the maxim "to sanitize is to eugenize".

Canada
In Canada, the eugenics movement gained support early in the 20th century as prominent physicians drew a direct link between heredity and public health. Eugenics was enforced by law in two Canadian provinces. In Alberta, the Sexual Sterilization Act was enacted in 1928, focusing the movement on the sterilization of mentally deficient individuals, as determined by the Alberta Eugenics Board. The campaign to enforce this action was backed by groups such as the United Farm Women's Group, including key member Emily Murphy.

As in many other former British Empire colonies, eugenic policies were linked to racist (and racialist) agendas pursued by various levels of government, such as the forced sterilization of Canada's indigenous peoples and specific provincial government initiatives, such as Alberta's eugenics program. As a brief illustration, in 1928 the province of Alberta started an initiative, "…allowing any inmate of a native residential school to be sterilized upon the approval of the school Principal. At least 3,500 Indian women are sterilized under this law." As of 2011, research into extant archival records of sterilization and direct killing of First Nations youth (through intentional transmission of disease and other means) under the residential school program is ongoing.

Individuals were assessed using IQ tests like the Stanford-Binet. This posed a problem to new immigrants arriving in Canada, as many had not mastered the English language, and often their scores denoted them as having impaired intellectual functioning. As a result, many of those sterilized under the Sexual Sterilization Act were immigrants who were unfairly categorized. The province of British Columbia enacted its own Sexual Sterilization Act in 1933. As in Alberta, the British Columbia Eugenics Board could recommend the sterilization of those it considered to be suffering from "mental disease or mental deficiency".

Although not enforced by laws as it was in Canada's western provinces, an obscenity trial in Depression-era Ontario, can be seen as an example of the influence of eugenics in Ontario. Dorothea Palmer, a nurse working for the Parents Information Bureau – a privately funded birth control organization based out of Kitchener, Ontario – was arrested in the predominantly Catholic community of Eastview, Ontario in 1936. She was accused of illegally providing birth control materials and knowledge to her clients, primarily poor women. The defense at her trial was mounted by an industrialist and influential eugenicist from Kitchener, A.R. Kaufman. Palmer was acquitted in early 1937. The trial lasted less than a year, and later became known as The Eastview Birth Control Trial, demonstrating the influence of the eugenics lobby in Ontario.

The popularity of the eugenics movement peaked during the Depression when sterilization was widely seen as a way of relieving society of the financial burdens imposed by defective individuals. Although the eugenics excesses of Nazi Germany diminished the popularity of the eugenics movement, the Sexual Sterilization Acts of Alberta and British Columbia were not repealed until 1972.

Germany

Nazi Germany under Adolf Hitler was well known for eugenics programs which attempted to maintain a "pure" Aryan race through a series of programs that ran under the banner of racial hygiene. Among other activities, the Nazis performed extensive experimentation on live human beings to test their genetic theories, ranging from simple measurement of physical characteristics to the research for Otmar von Verschuer carried out by Karin Magnussen using "human material" gathered by Josef Mengele on twins and others at Auschwitz death camp. During the 1930s and 1940s, the Nazi regime used forced sterilization on hundreds of thousands of people whom they viewed as mentally ill, an estimated 400,000 between 1934 and 1937. The scale of the Nazi program prompted one American eugenics advocate to seek an expansion of their program, with one complaining that "the Germans are beating us at our own game."

The Nazis went further, however, murdering tens of thousands of the institutionalized disabled through compulsory "euthanasia" programs such as Aktion T4. They used gas chambers and lethal injections to murder their victims.

They also implemented a number of "positive" eugenics policies, giving awards to Aryan women who had large numbers of children and encouraged a service in which "racially pure" single women could deliver illegitimate children. Allegations that such women were also impregnated by SS officers in the Lebensborn were not proven at the Nuremberg trials, but new evidence (and the testimony of Lebensborn children) has established more details about Lebensborn practices. Also, "racially valuable" children from occupied countries were forcibly removed from their parents and adopted by German people. Many of their concerns for eugenics and racial hygiene were also explicitly present in their systematic murder of millions of "undesirable" people, especially Jews who were singled out for the Final Solution, this policy led to the horrors seen in the Holocaust.

The scope and coercion involved in the German eugenics programs along with a strong use of the rhetoric of eugenics and so-called "racial science" throughout the regime created an indelible cultural association between eugenics and the Third Reich in the post-war years.

Two scholars, John Glad and Seymour W. Itzkoff of Smith College, have questioned the relation between eugenics and the Holocaust. They argue that, contrary to popular belief, Hitler did not regard the Jews as intellectually inferior and did not send them to the concentration camps on these grounds. They argue that Hitler had different reasons for his genocidal policies toward the Jews. Itzkoff writes that the Holocaust was "a vast dysgenic program to rid Europe of highly intelligent challengers to the existing Christian domination by a numerically and politically minuscule minority". Therefore, according to Itzkoff, "the Holocaust was the very antithesis of eugenic practice".

The ideas of eugenics and race were used, in part, as justification for German colonial expansion throughout the world. Germany, as well as Great Britain, sought to seize the colonial territories of other 'dying' empires which could no longer protect their possessions. Examples included China, the Portuguese Empire, the Spanish Empire, the Dutch Empire and the Danish Empire.

Thus the colonies Germany required for her bursting population, as markets for her overproductive industries and sources of vital raw materials, and as symbols of her world power would simply have to be taken from weaker nations, so the pan-Germans asserted publicly and the German government believed secretly.

German colonies in Africa

German colonies in Africa from 1885 to 1918 included German South-West Africa (present-day Namibia), Kamerun (present-day Cameroon), Togoland (present-day Togo) and German East Africa (present-day Tanzania. Rwanda and Burundi). Genocide was carried out there, against the Herero people of present-day Namibia and later a programme of research in physical anthropology was conducted using their skulls.

The rulers of German South West Africa carried out a programme of genocide against the aboriginal Herero people. One of the officials enacting this program was Heinrich Ernst Göring (the father of Hermann Göring), as well as General Adrian Dietrich Lothar von Trotha.

The 1918 British "Bluebook" documented the genocide that took place at Shark Island and Windhoek Concentration Camps, including photographs. The Bluebook was used as a negotiating tool by the British at the end of World War I to gain control of what had been German Southwest Africa, after Germany was defeated.

Skulls of the Herero were collected from Rehoboth, Namibia in about 1904, for the purpose of demonstrating the supposed physical inferiority of these people. The Kaiser Wilhelm Institute used the Herero skulls by 1928.

The physical anthropologists used measurements of skull capacity, etc., in an attempt to prove that Jews, Blacks and Italians were inherently "inferior" to Whites. Examples of such activity were found from about 1928 at the Kaiser Wilhelm Institute of Anthropology, Human Heredity, and Eugenics. This contrasted with a lot of 19th-century German anthropology which was generally more cosmopolitan.

German colonies in the Pacific
Eugen Fischer of the Kaiser Wilhelm Institute of Anthropology, Human Heredity, and Eugenics and his students carried out "Bastard studies" anthropological studies of mixed race people throughout the German colonial empire, including the colonies in Africa and the Pacific. Fischer also worked with the United States eugenicist Charles Davenport.

Caribbean and South America
Rita Hauschild, a doctoral student and then staff member of the Kaiser Wilhelm Institute for Human Heredity, Anthropology, and Eugenics, carried out "bastard studies", anthropometric studies of mixed-heritage populations in Trinidad and Venezuela, in pursuit of the Nazi doctrine of "racial hygiene". Her research was at first confined to Tovar, Venezuela, a former German colony, and was extended to Trinidad with support from the UK Foreign Office. The populations studied, in 1935 to 1937, were "Chinese-Negro hybrids" in Trinidad, "Chinese-Indian" and "Chinese-Negro" "hybrids" in Venezuela. In addition, Johannes Schaeuble engaged in "bastard studies" in Chile.

Japan

In the early part of the Shōwa era, Japanese governments executed a eugenics policy to limit the birth of children with "inferior" traits, as well as aiming to protect the life and health of mothers. The Race Eugenic Protection Law was submitted from 1934 to 1938 to the Imperial Diet. After four amendments, this draft was promulgated as the National Eugenic Law  in 1940 by the Konoe government. According to the Eugenic Protection Law (1948), sterilization could be enforced on criminals "with genetic predisposition to commit crime", patients with genetic diseases such as total color-blindness, hemophilia, albinism and ichthyosis, and mental affections such as schizophrenia, and manic-depressiveness, and those with epilepsy. Mental illnesses were added in 1952.

The Leprosy Prevention laws of 1907, 1931 and 1953, the last one only repealed in 1996, permitted the segregation of patients in sanitariums where forced abortions and sterilization were common, even if the laws did not refer to it, and authorized punishment of patients "disturbing peace", as most Japanese leprologists believed that vulnerability to the disease was inheritable. There were a few Japanese leprologists such as Noburo Ogasawara who argued against the "isolation-sterilization policy" but he was denounced as a traitor to the nation at the 15th conference of the Japanese Association of Leprology in 1941.

One of the last eugenic measures of the Shōwa regime was taken by the Higashikuni government. On 19 August 1945, the Home Ministry ordered local government offices to establish a prostitution service for Allied occupation soldiers to preserve the "purity" of the "Japanese race". The official declaration stated: "Through the sacrifice of thousands of "Okichis" of the Shōwa era, we shall construct a dike to hold back the mad frenzy of the occupation troops and cultivate and preserve the purity of our race long into the future..."

Korea

Early in the Japanese administration of Korea, staff at the Japanese Association of Leprology attempted to discourage marriage between Japanese women and Korean men who had been recruited from the peninsula as laborers following its annexation by Japan in 1910. In 1942, a survey report argued that "the Korean laborers brought to Japan... are of the lower classes and therefore of inferior constitution...By fathering children with Japanese women, these men could lower the caliber of the Yamato minzoku". However, eugenics pioneer Unno Kōtoku of Ryukyu University influentially argued based on heterosis in plants that exclusive Japanese endogamy might cause "degeneration" of the Japanese race. Since he regarded intermarriage with white or black people as "disastrous", he advocated intermarriage with Koreans, whose "inferior" physical characteristics would be subsumed by the "superior" Japanese, according to his thinking. Japanese-Korean intermarriage was promoted by the government in Korea using serological studies that claimed to prove that Japanese and Koreans had the same pure ancestral origin.

After independence in the late 1940s, both North and South Korea continued to perpetuate the idea of an ethnically homogeneous Korean nation based on a divine single bloodline. This "pure-blood-ism" (순혈주의) is a source of pride for many Koreans, and informs Korean nationalism, politics, and foreign relations. In South Korea, an ethnic nationalism tinged with pure blood ideology sustained the dictatorships of Syngman Rhee and Park Chung-hee, and it still serves as a unifying ideology, as Brian Reynolds Myers argues, in North Korea. Deep-seated cultural biases originating in eugenics policies result in discrimination against multiracial people in South Korea, according to the United Nations Committee on the Elimination of Racial Discrimination.

China
Eugenics was one of many ideas and programs debated in the 1920s and 1930s in Republican China, as a means of improving society and raising China's stature in the world.  The principal Chinese proponent of eugenics was the prominent sociologist Pan Guangdan, and a significant number of intellectuals entered into the debate, including Gao Xisheng, biologist Zhou Jianren, sociologist Chen Da, and Chen Jianshan, and many others. Chen Da is notable for the link he provides to the family planning policy and One Child Policy enacted in China after the establishment of the People's Republic of China.

The Beijing Genomics Institute does whole genome sequencing of very high IQ individuals around the world.  Geoffrey Miller claims that the Chinese may use this genetic data to increase the IQ of each subsequent generation by five to fifteen IQ points through the use of preimplantation embryo selection.

Singapore

Singapore practiced a limited form of eugenics that involved discouraging marriage between university graduates and nongraduates through segregation in matchmaking agencies, in the hope that the former would produce better children; and paid incentives for the uneducated to undergo sterilisation, among other procedures. The government introduced the "Graduate Mother Scheme" in the early 1980s to entice graduate women with incentives to get married, which was eventually scrapped due to public criticism and the implications it had on meritocracy.

Sweden

The law was passed while the Swedish Social Democratic Party was in power, though it was also supported by all other political parties in the Riksdag at the time, as well as the Lutheran Church and much of the medical profession. From about 1934 to 1975, Sweden sterilized more than 62,000 people.

The Swedish government inquiry found that about 30,000 of the 62,000 were sterilised under some form of pressure or coercion. As was the case in other programs, ethnicity and race were believed to be connected to mental and physical health. The Swedish government inquiry denied that the Swedish sterilisation programme targeted ethnic minorities.

There is proof that the programme targeted women. The goal of the program was to decrease deviant offspring. If one member of a family was considered deviant the whole family became the target of an investigation. It was perceived to be easier to persuade a woman to be sterilized than it was to persuade a man. For this reason women were more often sterilized than men, despite the fact that the medical procedure involved in the sterilization was simpler to carry out on a man.

Even as recently as 1996, the Swedish government rejected paying compensation to those who had been sterilized. Following a 1997 series of articles by the Polish-born journalist Maciej Zaremba, in Sweden's largest daily Dagens Nyheter, the issue of compensation for the victims was brought to Swedish and international attention. In 1999, the Swedish government began paying compensation of US$21,000 to the sterilized (and their families) who had "not consented" and had applied for compensation.

Other countries
Other countries that adopted some form of eugenics program at one time include Denmark, Estonia, Finland, France, Iceland, Norway, and Switzerland with programs to sterilize people the government declared to be mentally deficient. In Denmark, the first eugenics law was passed in 1926, under the Social Democrats, with more legislation being passed in 1932. Though the sterilization was initially voluntary (at least theoretically), the law passed in 1932 allowed for involuntary sterilization of some groups.

Marginalization after World War II and Crypto-Eugenics

Beginning in the late 1920s, greater appreciation of the difficulty of predicting characteristics of offspring from their heredity, and scientists' recognition of the inadequacy of simplistic theories of eugenics, undermined whatever scientific basis had been ascribed to the social movement. As the Great Depression took hold, criticism of economic value as a proxy for human worth became increasingly compelling. After the experience of Nazi Germany, many ideas about "racial hygiene" and "unfit" members of society were discredited. The Nuremberg Trials against former Nazi leaders revealed to the world many of the regime's genocidal practices and resulted in formalized policies of medical ethics and the 1950 UNESCO statement on race. Many scientific societies released their own similar "race statements" over the years, and the Universal Declaration of Human Rights, developed in response to abuses during the Second World War, was adopted by the United Nations in 1948 and affirmed, "Men and women of full age, without any limitation due to race, nationality or religion, have the right to marry and to found a family." In continuation, the 1978 UNESCO declaration on race and racial prejudice states that the fundamental equality of all human beings is the ideal toward which ethics and science should converge.

In reaction to Nazi abuses, eugenics became almost universally reviled in many of the nations where it had once been popular (however, some eugenics programs, including sterilization, continued quietly for decades). Many pre-war eugenicists engaged in what they later labeled "crypto-eugenics", purposefully taking their eugenic beliefs "underground" and becoming respected anthropologists, biologists and geneticists in the postwar world (including Robert Yerkes in the U.S. and Otmar von Verschuer in Germany). Californian eugenicist Paul Popenoe founded marriage counseling during the 1950s, a career change which grew from his eugenic interests in promoting "healthy marriages" between "fit" couples.

In 1957, a special meeting of Britain's Eugenics Society discussed ways to stem losses in membership, including the suggestion "that the Society should pursue eugenic ends by less obvious means, that is by a policy of crypto-eugenics, which was apparently proving successful with the US Eugenics Society". In February 1960 the Council resolved to pursue "activities in crypto-eugenics...vigorously" and "specifically" to increase payments to the Family Planning Association and the International Planned Parenthood Federation. The subsequent sale of a birth-control clinic (the bequest of Dr Marie Stopes) to Dr Tim Black and the change of Society's name to Galton Institute (on the grounds that it was "less evocative") align with the Society's crypto-eugenic policy.

The American Life League, an opponent of abortion, charges that eugenics was merely "re-packaged" after the war, and promoted anew in the guise of the population-control and environmentalism movements. They claim, for example, that Planned Parenthood was funded and cultivated by the Eugenics Society for these reasons. Julian Huxley, the first Director-General of UNESCO and a founder of the World Wildlife Fund, was also a Eugenics Society president and a strong supporter of eugenics.

[E]ven though it is quite true that any radical eugenic policy will be for many years politically and psychologically impossible, it will be important for UNESCO to see that the eugenic problem is examined with the greatest care, and that the public mind is informed of the issues at stake so that much that now is unthinkable may at least become thinkable. --Julian Huxley

High school and college textbooks from the 1920s through the 1940s often had chapters touting the scientific progress to be had from applying eugenic principles to the population. Many early scientific journals devoted to heredity in general were run by eugenicists and featured eugenics articles alongside studies of heredity in nonhuman organisms.  Even the names of some journals changed to reflect new attitudes. For example, Eugenics Quarterly became Social Biology in 1969 (the journal still exists today, though it looks little like its predecessor). Notable members of the American Eugenics Society (1922–94) during the second half of the 20th century included Joseph Fletcher, originator of Situational ethics; Clarence Gamble of the Procter & Gamble fortune; and Garrett Hardin, a population control advocate and author of the essay The Tragedy of the Commons.

In the United States, the eugenics movement had largely lost most popular and political support by the end of the 1930s, while forced sterilizations mostly ended in the 1960s with the last performed in 1981. Many US states continued to prohibit biracial marriages with "anti-miscegenation laws" such as Virginia's Racial Integrity Act of 1924, until they were overruled by the Supreme Court in 1967 in Loving v. Virginia. The Immigration Restriction Act of 1924, which was designed to limit the immigration of "dysgenic" Italians, and eastern European Jews, was repealed and replaced by the Immigration and Nationality Act in 1965.

However, some prominent academics continued to support eugenics after the war. In 1963 the Ciba Foundation convened a conference in London under the title "Man and His Future", at which three distinguished biologists and Nobel laureates (Hermann Muller, Joshua Lederberg, and Francis Crick) all spoke strongly in favor of eugenics. A few nations, notably the Canadian province of Alberta, maintained large-scale eugenics programs, including forced sterilization of mentally handicapped individuals, as well as other practices, until the 1970s.

Modern eugenics, genetic engineering, and ethical re-evaluation
Beginning in the 1880s, the history and concept of eugenics were widely discussed as knowledge about genetics advanced significantly, making practical genetic engineering, which has been widely used to produce genetically modified organisms, with genetically modified foods being most visible to the general public. Endeavors such as the Human Genome Project made the effective modification of the human species seem possible again (as did Darwin's initial theory of evolution in the 1860s, along with the rediscovery of Mendel's laws in the early 20th century).  Article 23 of the Convention on the Rights of Persons with Disabilities prohibits compulsory sterilization of disabled individuals and guarantees their right to adopt children.

A few scientific researchers such as psychologist Richard Lynn, psychologist Raymond Cattell, and scientist Gregory Stock have openly called for eugenic policies using modern technology, but they represent a minority opinion in current scientific and cultural circles. One attempted implementation of a form of eugenics was a "genius sperm bank" (1980–99) created by Robert Klark Graham, from which nearly 230 children were conceived (the best-known donors were Nobel Prize winners William Shockley and J. D. Watson). After Graham died in 1997 funding ran out, and within two years his sperm bank had closed.

Richard J. Herrnstein and Charles Murray's book The Bell Curve argued that immigration from countries with low national IQ is undesirable. According to Raymond Cattell, "when a country is opening its doors to immigration from diverse countries, it is like a farmer who buys his seeds from different sources by the sack, with sacks of different average quality of contents".

Cyprus
A screening policy (including prenatal screening and abortion) intended to reduce the incidence of thalassemia exists in both jurisdictions on the island of Cyprus. Since the program's implementation in the 1970s, it has reduced the ratio of children born with the hereditary blood disease from 1 out of every 158 births to almost zero. Tests for the gene are compulsory for both partners, prior to church wedding.

China
Eugenic concerns have been prominent in China for some time, with the People's Republic of China's 1950 Marriage Law stating that "impotence, venereal disease, mental disorder and leprosy", as well as any other diseases seen by medical science as making a person unfit to marry, were grounds for prohibition from marriage. The 1980 law dropped all specific conditions bar leprosy, and the 2001 law now specifies no conditions, simply approval by a medical doctor.

Various provinces began to pass laws barring certain classes of people, such as the mentally delayed, from reproducing in the late 1980s. The Chinese Maternal and Infant Health Care Law (1994), which has been referred to as the "Eugenic Law" in the West, required a health check prior to marriage. Carriers of certain genetic diseases were allowed to marry only if they are sterilized, or agree to use some other form of long-term contraception. Though the requirement for the health check has been dropped at the national level, it continues to be required by some provinces. Local medical doctors make the decision on who is "unfit" to marry. Much Western comment on the law has been critical, but many Chinese geneticists are supportive of the policy.

In the Chinese province of Sichuan in 1999, a sperm bank called Notables' Sperm Bank opened, with professors as the only permitted donors. The semen bank was approved by the authority for family planning in the provincial capital Chengdu.

Japan
The main provisions allowed for the surgical sterilization of women, when the woman, her spouse, or family member within the 4th degree of kinship had a serious genetic disorder, and where pregnancy would endanger the life of the woman. The operation required consent of the woman, her spouse and the approval of the Prefectural Eugenic Protection Council.

The law also allowed for abortion for pregnancies in the cases of rape, leprosy, hereditary-transmitted disease, or if the physician determined that the fetus would not be viable outside of the womb. Again, the consent of the woman and her spouse were necessary. Birth control guidance and implementation was restricted to doctors, nurses and professional midwives accredited by the Prefectural government. The law was also amended in May 1949 to allow abortions for economic reasons at the sole discretion of the doctor, which in effect fully legalized abortion in Japan.

Although the law's wording is unambiguous, it was used by local authorities as justification for measures enforcing forced sterilization and abortions upon people with certain genetic disorders, as well as leprosy, as well as an excuse for legalized discrimination against people with physical and mental handicaps.

Russia
In Russia, one supporter of preventive eugenics is the president of the Independent Psychiatric Association of Russia Yuri Savenko, who justifies forced sterilization of women, which is practiced in Moscow psychoneurological nursing homes. He states that “one needs a more strictly adjusted and open control for the practice of preventive eugenics, which, in itself, is, in its turn, justifiable.” In 1993, the health minister of the Russian Federation issued the order that determined the procedure of forced abortion and sterilization of disabled women and the need for court decision to perform them. The order was repealed by the head of Ministry of Health and Social Development of the Russian Federation Tatyana Golikova in 2009. Therefore, now women can be subjected to compulsory sterilization without court decision, according to the Perm Krai ombudswoman Tatyana Margolina. In 2008, Tatyana Margolina reported that 14 women with disabilities were subjected to compulsory medical sterilization in Ozyorskiy psychoneurological nursing home whose director was Grigori Bannikov. The sterilizations were performed not on the basis mandatory court decision appropriate for them, but only on the basis of the application by the guardian Bannikov. On 2 December 2010, the court has not found corpus delicti in the compulsory medical sterilizations performed by his consent.

United States
Mississippi, Montana and the District of Columbia require a blood test prior to marriage. While these tests are typically restricted to the detection of the sexually transmitted disease syphilis (which was the most common STD at the time these laws were enacted), some partners will voluntarily test for other diseases and genetic incompatibilities. Harris polls in 1986 and 1992 recorded majority public support for limited forms of germ-line intervention, especially to prevent "children inheriting usually fatal genetic disease".

Israel

Dor Yeshorim, a program which seeks to reduce the incidence of Tay–Sachs disease, cystic fibrosis, Canavan disease, Fanconi anemia, familial dysautonomia, glycogen storage disease, Bloom Syndrome, Gaucher disease, Niemann-Pick disease, and mucolipidosis IV among certain Jewish communities, is another screening program which has drawn comparisons with liberal eugenics. In Israel, at the expense of the state, the general public is advised to carry out genetic tests to diagnose these diseases early in the pregnancy. If a fetus is diagnosed with one of these diseases, among which Tay–Sachs is the most commonly known, the pregnancy may be terminated, subject to consent.

Most other Ashkenazi Jewish communities also run screening programs because of the higher incidence of genetic diseases. In some Jewish communities, the ancient custom of matchmaking (shidduch) is still practiced, and some matchmakers require blood tests so that they can avoid making matches between individuals who share the same recessive disease traits. In order to attempt to prevent the tragedy of infant death which always results from being homozygous for Tay–Sachs, associations such as the strongly observant Dor Yeshorim (which was founded by Rabbi Joseph Ekstein, who lost four children to the disease) with the purpose of preventing others from suffering the same tragedy test young couples to check whether they carry a risk of passing on fatal conditions.

If both the young man and woman are Tay–Sachs carriers, it is common for the match to be broken off. Judaism, like numerous other religions, discourages abortion unless there is a risk to the woman, in which case her needs take precedence. The effort is not aimed at eradicating the hereditary traits, but rather at the occurrence of homozygosity. The actual impact of this program on allele frequencies is unknown, but little impact would be expected because the program does not impose genetic selection. Instead, it encourages disassortative mating.

Ethical re-assessment
Modern inquiries into the potential use of genetic engineering have led to an increased invocation of the history of eugenics in discussions of bioethics, most often as a cautionary tale. Some suggest that even non-coercive eugenics programs would be inherently unethical. This view has been challenged by such bioethicist critics as Nicholas Agar.

In modern bioethics literature, the history of eugenics presents many moral and ethical questions. Supporters of eugenics programs note that Francis Galton did not advocate coercion when he defined the principles of eugenics. According to Galton's definition, eugenics is the proper label for bioengineering of better human beings, whether coercive or not.

An example of such individual motivations includes parents attempting to prevent homosexuality in their children, despite lack of evidence of a single genetic cause of homosexuality. The scientific consensus in America, which stems from the 1956 research of Evelyn Hooker, is that homosexuality, in any case, is not a disorder. Therefore, it cannot be treated as a defective trait that is justifiably screened for as part of legitimate medical practice.

Daniel Kevles argues that eugenics and the conservation of natural resources are similar propositions. Both can be practiced foolishly so as to abuse individual rights, but both can be practiced wisely. James D. Watson, the first director of the Human Genome Project, initiated the Ethical, Legal and Social Implications Program (ELSI) which has funded a number of studies into the implications of human genetic engineering (along with a prominent website on the history of eugenics), because:

In putting ethics so soon into the genome agenda, I was responding to my own personal fear that all too soon critics of the Genome Project would point out that I was a representative of the Cold Spring Harbor Laboratory that once housed the controversial Eugenics Record Office. My not forming a genome ethics program quickly might be falsely used as evidence that I was a closet eugenicist, having as my real long-term purpose the unambiguous identification of genes that lead to social and occupational stratification as well as genes justifying racial discrimination.

Distinguished geneticists including Nobel Prize-winners John Sulston ("I don't think one ought to bring a clearly disabled child into the world") and Watson ("Once you have a way in which you can improve our children, no one can stop it") support genetic screening. Which ideas should be described as "eugenic" are still controversial in both public and scholarly spheres. Some observers such as Philip Kitcher have described the use of genetic screening by parents as making possible a form of "voluntary" eugenics.

In 2006, Richard Dawkins stated that breeding humans for traits is possible and society should not be afraid to debate the ethical differences between breeding a child for an ability versus forcing a child to gain an ability through training. Nathaniel C. Comfort, Professor at the Institute of the History of Medicine at the Johns Hopkins University, published in his 2012 book, The Science of Human Perfection: How Genes Became the Heart of American Medicine, "The eugenic impulse drives us to eliminate disease, live longer and healthier, with greater intelligence, and a better adjustment to the conditions of society." Comfort claims that the question is not whether this eugenic impulse should exist or even whether the modern genetic movement should be called eugenics because these things "just are". Additionally, Dr Nathaniel Comfort claims, "the health benefits, the intellectual thrill and the profits of genetic biomedicine are too great for us to do otherwise." Bio-ethicist Stephen Wilkinson of Keele University and Honorary Research Fellow Eve Garrard at the University of Manchester, claim that some aspects of modern genetics can be classified as eugenics, but this classification does not inherently make modern genetics immoral. In a co-authored publication by Keele University, they stated that "[e]ugenics doesn't seem always to be immoral, and so the fact that PGD, and other forms of selective reproduction, might sometimes technically be eugenic, isn't sufficient to show that they’re wrong."

Geoffrey Miller claims that 21st-century Chinese eugenics may allow the Chinese to increase the IQ of each subsequent generation by five to fifteen IQ points, and after a couple generations it "would be game over for Western global competitiveness." Miller recommends that we put aside our "self-righteous" Euro-American ideological biases and learn from the Chinese.

Jon Entine claims that new eugenics is not something that should be restricted lightly because it is driven by a motivation for ourselves and our children to be "healthy, intelligent, and fit," and it is not driven by "draconian top-down measures" or a "desire to improve the species."

There are over 700 mutations in the mitochondrial DNA, and Salvatore DiMauro advocates that cytoplasmic transfer can be used to prevent "a Pandora's box of diseases, including recurrent strokes, seizures, blindness, deafness, diabetes, and a brain-destroying illness called necrotizing encephalopathy."

Bill McKibben, for example, suggests that emerging reprogenetic technologies would be disproportionately available to those with greater financial resources, thereby exacerbating the gap between rich and poor and creating a "genetic divide". Lee M. Silver, a biologist and science writer who coined the term "reprogenetics" and supports its applications, has nonetheless expressed concern that these methods could create a two-tiered society of genetically-engineered "haves" and "have nots" if social democratic reforms lag behind implementation of reprogenetic technologies.

Maxwell J. Mehlman argues that our democratic society could be endangered if unequal access to genetic enhancement technology creates a "genobility" and the gap between the genetically enhanced and unenhanced widens. Mehlman suggests that the government should subsidize the cost of genetic enhancement technology to ensure it is equally available.

References

External links

Historical resources
Eugenics Archive – Historical Material on the Eugenics Movement (funded by the Human Genome Project)
University of Virginia Historical Collections: Eugenics
"Deadly Medicine: Creating the Master Race" (United States Holocaust Memorial Museum exhibit)
"Controlling Heredity: The American Eugenics Crusade, 1870–1940", exhibit at the University of Missouri Libraries
"Eugenics" – National Reference Center for Bioethics Literature Scope Note 28, features overview of eugenics history and annotated bibliography of historical literature
1907 Indiana Eugenics Law
The Fertility of the Unfit, W.A. Chappel, 1903
Mental Defectives and Sexual Offenders, NZ Committee of inquiry, 1925

 
Eugenics
Applied genetics
Eugenics
Eugenics
Scientific racism